Mirjam is a Dutch, Estonian, Finnish and German feminine given name cognate to Miriam. Notable people with the name include:

 Mirjam Bikker (born 1982), Dutch politician
 Mirjam van Breeschooten (born 1970), Dutch model
 Mirjam Gysling (born 1987), Swiss cyclist
 Mirjam Hauser-Senn (born 1980), Swiss cyclist
 Mirjam van Hemert (born 1950), Dutch swimmer
 Mirjam Hooman-Kloppenburg (born 1966), Dutch table tennis player
 Mirjam Indermaur (born 1967), Swiss businesswoman and writer
 Mirjam Jäger (born 1982), Swiss freestyle skier
 Mirjam Jäger-Fischer (born 1977), Austrian politician
 Mirjam de Koning (born 1969), Dutch paraplegic swimmer
 Mirjam Kristensen (born 1978), Norwegian novelist and non-fiction writer
 Mirjam Kuenkler, American professor of Middle Eastern politics
 Mirjam Liimask (born 1983), Estonian hurdler
 Mirjam Melchers (born 1975), Dutch cyclist
 Mirjam Müntefering (born 1969), German author
 Mirjam Novak, German actress and screenwriter 
 Mirjam Novero (1915–1996), Finnish film actress
 Mirjam Oldenhave (born 1960), Dutch author of children's literature
 Mirjam Orsel (born 1978), Dutch volleyball player
 Mirjam Ott (born 1972), Swiss curler
 Mirjam Overdam (born 1978), Dutch water polo player
 Mirjam Polkunen (1926–2012), Finnish writer, translator and dramatist
 Mirjam Puchner (born 1992), Austrian alpine skier
 Mirjam Sterk (born 1973), Dutch politician and Christian minister
 Mirjam Tally (born 1976), Estonian composer
 Mirjam Timmer (born 1982), Dutch singer-songwriter
 Mirjam Tola (born 1972), Albanian operatic soprano
 Mirjam Tuokkola (born 1997), Finnish archer
 Mirjam Weichselbraun (born 1971), Austrian television host

See also
 Miriam (given name)

Dutch feminine given names
Estonian feminine given names
Finnish feminine given names
German feminine given names
Swiss feminine given names